Lego fandom is the fan community that exists around the Lego toys.

While Lego is primarily seen as a children's toy, there are a significant number of adult fans of Lego (AFOL).

Adult fans of Lego 
Adult members of the Lego fandom are called adult fans of Lego (AFOL). Many AFOLs design complex sets, known as MOCs ("My Own Creation"), using computer software such as LDraw or MLCAD for their planning. Many AFOLs have dedicated "Lego rooms" in their houses.

Activities of more dedicated AFOLs go beyond creating Lego models, and include attending Lego conventions, participating in online Lego communities, and less often, cosplay, writing fanfiction or drawing fan art.

Large AFOL conventions include events such as Brickworld, BrickFair or Bricks by the Bay.

Many AFOLs self-identify as "geeks" or "nerds". In the United States, in the mid-2010s, most AFOLs were white, college-educated males in their 20s or 30s, although as time goes, the age of the average member of the community is steadily increasing, as more people who grew up with Lego become middle-aged or older. AFOLs usually played with Lego sets as kids, and rediscovered the hobby at some later time in their nostalgic adulthood.

The LEGO company recognizes the AFOL community as an important part of its customer base and maintains a number of outreach programs connecting it to the fan community. In some cases, entire official Lego sets can be seen as intended not for children but for adult fans.

See also 
List of Lego conventions
LUGNET
The Art of the Brick

References 

Lego
Fandom
20th-century establishments